The Cabinet of Ministers of Tajikistan is the chief executive body in Tajikistan. The Cabinet of Ministers is formed by the Prime Minister of Tajikistan as the head of government on behald of the President of Tajikistan. It was established in July 1991 as a reorganization of the Council of Ministers of the Tajik SSR. The cabinet is currently led by Prime Minister Kokhir Rasulzoda, who was appointed in 2013.

Current Members of the Cabinet of Ministers

References

Government ministers of Tajikistan